The Flandrien of the Year (Dutch: Flandrien-Trofee) is an annual award presented by the Flemish newspaper Het Nieuwsblad to the best Belgian cyclist of the year. The prize has been awarded since 2003 and was originally awarded based on a vote by the public, and open to any nationality. The first winner of the award was the Italian Paolo Bettini. Since 2008, separate awards were created for the best Belgian cyclist, the best international cyclist, and the best Belgian female cyclist (Flandrienne of the Year). Also since 2008, the voting system was changed and only people from within the world of cycling choose the winners from a jury's list of nominees. Since 2014, an award for best international cyclo-cross cyclist was added. This latter award was replaced in 2019 by the Trophy Patrick Sercu in honour of the Belgian rider who died that year. The Trophy Patrick Sercu is awarded to the best non-road race cyclist

The award is seen as prestigious in the world of cycling, especially since it is voted on by fellow cyclists. It is also seen as rewarding the cyclist who most embodies the tough and hard-working values of the Flandrien cyclists of years gone by, such as Briek Schotte. International Flandrien of the Year 2013 Chris Froome summed up these sentiments when he accepted the award, saying: "A Flandrien is to me someone, no matter how tough the conditions are, never gives up. Someone who has the character of a fighter."

Road Race Winners

(Open) Flandrien of the Year (2003-2007)

(Belgian) Flandrien of the Year (2008-)

International Flandrien of the Year (2008-)

By country

(Belgian) Flandrienne of the Year (2008-)

International Flandrienne of the Year (2022-)

Non-Road Race Winners

Flandrien of the Cyclo-Cross (2014-2018)

Trophy Patrick Sercu (2019-)

Lifetime Achievement Award

References

Cycle racing
Cycling awards